Ariel Aquino Muhlach (born August 12, 1969), popularly known as Aga Muhlach, is a Filipino actor. Regarded as the "King of Romance-Drama" and the Philippines' Original Hearthrob, he has received numerous local and international accolades throughout his career, including Star Awards, Maria Clara Awards, and FAMAS Award.

He was introduced to the entertainment industry using his real name "Ariel Muhlach" at the age of seven when he appeared in the 1975 film May Isang Tsuper ng Taksi and the 1976 film, Babaing Hiwalay Sa Asawa, but he only became well known (under his new screen name "Aga Muhlach") with the success of the 1984 film Bagets, after which he became a popular matinee idol. He also unsuccessfully ran for a 2013 congressional seat in Camarines Sur.

As of October 2015, during the 60th birthday of ABS-CBN President Charo Santos-Concio, Muhlach confirmed that he has returned to original home network ABS-CBN after more than three years with TV5.

Biography

Early life
Aga Muhlach was born at 2:30 PM on August 12, 1969, at Galang Maternity Clinic in Santa Cruz, Manila to Álvaro Amador Muhlach (January 16, 1944-May 12, 2018) and Anita Adis Aquino (May 26, 1949-November 18, 2007). He is one of nine children: three sisters Arlene, Almira and Andrea; and five brothers AJ, Andrew, Anton, Aaron and Albert. He finished high school at Aquinas School in San Juan City, and entered San Beda College to study Commerce. He discontinued studies when he focused on his acting career.
 
Muhlach is from a prominent show business family. His father is a younger brother of former dramatic actress Amalia Fuentes; his cousin, Niño Muhlach, was the leading child actor of the 1970s; his brother AJ Muhlach was a member of boy band XLR8; his two sisters are also actresses.

His family has Spanish (Asturian), German, and Chinese roots. His paternal grandfather, Álvaro Muhlach Agüera, was born in Barcelona, Spain, to Alejandro Muhlach Agüera and Enriqueta Agüera Iglesias, who were from Santander and Comillas, respectively both in Cantabria, but their ancestry originated from Asturias. His paternal grandmother, Concepción Borja Amador, was born in Xiamen, China, to a Chinese father and a Bicolano mother from Goa, Camarines Sur.

Acting career

1970s–1980s: Teenage years
He began his career as a child actor in the 1975 film, May Isang Tsuper ng Taksi and 1976 film, Babaing Hiwalay Sa Asawa; his aunt Amalia Fuentes was the lead in the latter film. At this point he was still using his real name in the credits. He also appeared in the 1980 film Aguila which starred Fernando Poe Jr. and Christopher de Leon.

At age 14, Muhlach was cast as one of the male leads in Viva Entertainment's 1984 film, Bagets. The film, which is about typical teenage life in the 80s, also starred William Martinez, Herbert Bautista, JC Bonnin, and Raymond Lauchengco. As the majority of the target audience could relate to the story, the film was a success, and Muhlach became a popular matinee idol.

As a result of his popularity, he was cast in the title role in Miguelito, Ang Batang Rebelde, in which he portrayed a rebellious teenager in conflict with his mother. He was nominated for "Best Supporting Actor" in the FAMAS Awards, and "Best Actor" in the Gawad Urian Awards.

He was paired with Janice de Belen in the 1986 film, Super-Wan-Tu-Tri, alongside Tito Sotto, Vic Sotto, and Joey de Leon. The next year, he received his first acting award at the 1987 Gawad Urian Awards for "Best Supporting Actor" for his performance in the 1986 film, Napakasakit, Kuya Eddie.

1990s: Mature roles
With a younger generation of actors emerging, Muhlach took on the challenge of more mature roles, increasing his stock as one of the top matinee idols. Hiring publicist Ethel Ramos as his manager, he developed into one of the top dramatic actors of the 1990s.

He was the male lead in light-hearted chick flick films Bakit Labis Kitang Mahal (1992) and Sana Maulit Muli (1995) with leading lady Lea Salonga, Bakit Pa Kita Minahal (1994) with Kris Aquino and Ruffa Gutierrez, Basta't Kasama Kita (1995) with Dayanara Torres, May Minamahal (1993) and Ikaw Pa Rin Ang Iibigin (1998) with Aiko Melendez, and Dahil May Isang Ikaw (1999) with Regine Velasquez, as well as starring in more serious dramas: Nag-Iisang Bituin (1994) with Vilma Santos, Sinungaling Mong Puso (1992) with Gabby Concepcion, Bayarang Puso (1996) with Lorna Tolentino, and Sa Aking Mga Kamay (1996) with Christopher de Leon among others.

He also branched out into television sitcoms including his first as a lead in ABS-CBN's Oki Doki Doc from 1993 to 2000. The series had a film spin-off entitled Oki Doki Doc: The Movie produced by Star Cinema in 1996.

2000s–present: A "leading man" of his generation
In the 2000s, Muhlach appeared in a number of television series such as Da Body En Da Guard (2001), Da Pilya En Da Pilot (2001), OK Fine Whatever (2003), and the continuation of Oki Doki Doc, That's My Doc (2007).

After 18 years at ABS-CBN, Muhlach transferred to TV5 in 2011 to focus more on hosting. His last project with ABS-CBN was M3: Malay Mo Ma-develop in 2010, and In the Name of Love with Star Cinema.

In 2013, there were discussions about Muhlach teaming up with his former leading actress, Lea Salonga for the third time.

Personal life
In the early days of his acting career, he was often turned down for roles. For example, Lily Monteverde, a Regal Films producer turned him down many times after Douglas Quijano, talent manager, had introduced Muhlach and the film Bagets to her. Muchlach also had problems managing his finances and was often without money. in the early 90s he was given upbeat projects In 1992, Lily Monteverde produced Sinungaling Mong Puso with Vilma Santos which gained Aga Muhlach his Best Supporting Actor he gained notoriety for his on and off again relationship with Janice De Belen as they started in Pakasalan Mo Ako with co actors John Estrada and Gabby Concepcion. In 1990-1999 he was the most paid actor, he was paired with Aiko Melendez in May Minamahal, (1994, 1997) Kris Aquino (1993, 1994), Ruffa Gutierrez, G. Toengi (1999), Mikee Cojuangco-Jaworski (1994, 1998) Regine Velasquez, (1999, 2001, 2012) Lorna Tolentino, (1996) Carmina Villaroel, (1994, 1996) Maricel Laxa, (1994) Dawn Zulueta, (1993) beauty queen Dayanara Torres (1995) Lea Salonga, (1992, 1995) Alice Dixson and Snooky Serna (1991). In the 2000s he worked with then controversial sex goddess Joyce Jimenez in 2001 on sitcom TV in Da Body en Da Guard and even in romantic com film in Narinig Mo Na Ba Ang Latest? In 2001 he starred in the box office hit Pangako Ikaw Lang with Velasquez In 2002 he starred with future box office actresses Claudine Barretto in Kailangan Kita in 2002, and Dubai 2005, Sharon Cuneta in Kung Ako Na Lang Sana (2003), Kristine Hermosa in All My Life 2004, Maricel Soriano and Angelica Panganiban in A Love Story (2007), and 2008 with Anne Curtis in When Love Begins. In the 2010s he starred in In The Name Of Love with Angel Locsin as well as Miracle in Cell No. 7 with Bela Padilla.

Romantic relationships
In 1986, 17-year-old Muhlach decided to have a child with Janice de Belen after being paired up in the film, Super-Wan-Tu-Tri. De Belen announced her pregnancy on a primetime television and said that Muhlach had asked her to marry him, but that she had refused as they were still young. Muhlach's father was also against the marriage because of their ages. De Belen gave birth to Luigi "Igi Boy" Muhlach, Muhlach's first child.

In 1993, he was dating Aiko Melendez during the shoot of their movie May Minamahal but after their relationship ended, he was linked romantically with Puerto Rican former Miss Universe and 1995 film Basta't Kasama Kita leading actress Dayanara Torres. Reports said that Muhlach had been intending to follow Torres to Puerto Rico and marry her, but did not because he chose his acting career over personal matters. The couple dated for about three to four years.

Married life
Muhlach married Charlene Gonzalez in May 2001. They started dating only after he asked for her parents' permission to get engaged to her. They met through Gonzalez' cousin and his former co-star, J.C. Bonnin, when he was 16 years old. They met again during the 1994 Binibining Pilipinas pageant in which he was the judge and she won as Binibing Pilipinas–Universe. She was also his co-star in Oki Doki Doc, where they became friends. They got married on May 28, 2001, in St. Joseph the Worker Parish in Pacdal, Baguio, less than a year after their engagement. They have twins named Atasha and Andres.

Legacy

Muhlach is considered one of the most bankable actors in the Philippine entertainment industry. He is known for being one of the Philippine cinema's leading men of romantic dramas, being partnered up with well-known leading ladies such as Lea Salonga, Sharon Cuneta, Claudine Barretto, Maricel Soriano, Angel Locsin, Regine Velasquez, Kris Aquino, Aiko Melendez,  Anne Curtis and recently Bea Alonzo and Bela Padilla. He is also claimed as a multi-media product endorser, a role model to Filipinos of all ages, a supporter of underprivileged children, a matinee idol, and multi-award winning actor.

Politics
In 2013, Muhlach ran for a seat in the House of Representatives to represent Camarines Sur's 4th district under the then-ruling Liberal Party. However, he lost to Felix William Fuentebella, son of outgoing representative Arnulfo Fuentebella and a member of a political dynasty, by almost 3,000 votes. He filed an electoral protest before the House of Representatives Electoral Tribunal on June 4, 2013, alleging that there was massive vote buying, ballot tampering or errors on vote-counting machines in seven municipalities under the district. However, it was later dismissed as he and Fuentebella mutually agreed to drop the case.

Filmography

Film

Television

Endorsements
He is one of the male celebrities who are in-demand for advertising contracts. One of his advertisements is with Jollibee, in which he is a longtime commercial endorser of the fast food chain. In addition, he is the founder of MaAga Ang Pasko, an annual Christmas gift giving event of Jollibee starting in 1994, wherein people can donate things such as toys and clothes.

The following is an incomplete list of his former and present commercials and product endorsements:

Awards and nominations

FAMAS Awards

2018    Nominated       Best Supporting Actor
FAMAS Award
Seven Sundays (2017)
		
2012	Nominated	Best Actor
	FAMAS Award	In the Name of Love (2011)

2009	Nominated	Best Actor
	FAMAS Award	When Love Begins... (2008)

2008	Nominated	Best Actor
	FAMAS Award	A Love Story (2007)

2006	Nominated	Best Actor
	FAMAS Award	Dubai (2005)

2005	Nominated	Best Actor
	FAMAS Award	All My Life (2004)

2004	Nominated	Best Actor
	FAMAS Award	Kung ako na lang sana (2003)
 
2000	Nominated	Best Actor
	FAMAS Award	Dahil may isang ikaw (1999)

1997	Nominated	Best Actor
	FAMAS Award	Bayarang puso (1996)

1996	Nominated	Best Actor
	FAMAS Award	Sana maulit muli (1995)

1994	Nominated	Best Actor
	FAMAS Award	May minamahal (1993)

1993	Won	Best Actor
	FAMAS Award	Sinungaling mong puso (1992)

1986	Nominated	Best Supporting Actor
	FAMAS Award	Miguelito: Batang rebelde (1985)

		
FAP Awards, Philippines	

2018       Won     Best Actor
FAP Award
Seven Sundays 
(2017)

2013	Nominated	Best Actor
	FAP Award	Of All the Things (2012)

2009	Nominated	Best Actor
	FAP Award	When Love Begins... (2008)

2008	Nominated	Best Actor
	FAP Award	A Love Story (2007)

1996	Nominated	Best Actor
	FAP Award	Sana maulit muli (1995)

		
Gawad Urian Awards
		
2004	Nominated	Best Actor (Pinakamahusay na Pangunahing Aktor)
	Gawad Urian Award	Kung ako na lang sana (2003)

2003	Nominated	Best Actor (Pinakamahusay na Pangunahing Aktor)
	Gawad Urian Award	Kailangan kita (2002)

1996	Won	Best Actor (Pinakamahusay na Pangunahing Aktor)
	Gawad Urian Award	Sana maulit muli (1995)

1994	Nominated	Best Actor (Pinakamahusay na Pangunahing Aktor)
	Gawad Urian Award	May minamahal (1993)

1993	Nominated	Best Actor (Pinakamahusay na Pangunahing Aktor)
	Gawad Urian Award	Bakit Labis Kitang Mahal (1992)

1992	Nominated	Best Actor (Pinakamahusay na Pangunahing Aktor)
	Gawad Urian Award	Akin ka magdusa man ako (1993)

1987	Won	Best Supporting Actor (Pinakamahusay na Pangalawang Aktor)
	Gawad Urian Award	Napakasakit, kuya Eddie (1986)

1986	Nominated	Best Actor (Pinakamahusay na Pangunahing Aktor)
	Gawad Urian Award	Miguelito: Batang rebelde (1985)

		
Golden Screen Awards, Philippines	
	
2013	Won	Best Performance by an Actor in a Leading Role (Musical or Comedy)
	Golden Screen Award	Of All the Things (2012)

	Won	
	Dekada Award
	
2012	Won	Best Performance by an Actor in a Leading Role (Drama)
	Golden Screen Award	In the Name of Love (2011)

2006	Nominated	Best Performance by an Actor in a Leading Role (Drama)
	Golden Screen Award	Dubai (2005)

2004	Won	Best Performance by an Actor in a Lead Role (Musical or Comedy)
	Golden Screen Award	Kung ako na lang sana (2003)

		
Maria Clara Awards
		
2006	Won	Best Actor
	Maria Clara Award	Dubai (2005)

		
Metro Manila Film Festival

2019 Nominated Best Actor
Festival Prize Miracle in Cell No.7
		
1993	Won	Best Actor
	Festival Prize	May minamahal (1993)

1992	Won	Best Actor
	Festival Prize	Bakit Labis Kitang Mahal (1992)
 
		
Star Awards for Movies
		
2013	Nominated	Movie Actor of the Year
	Star Award	Of All the Things (2012)

	Nominated	Darling of the Press
	Special Award	

2012	Won	Movie Actor of the Year
	Star Award	In the Name of Love (2011)
		Tied with Jorge Estregan for Manila Kingpin: The Asiong Salonga Story (2011)

2009	Nominated	Movie Actor of the Year
	Star Award	When Love Begins... (2008)

2008	Nominated	Movie Actor of the Year
	Star Award	A Love Story (2007)

2006	Won	Movie Actor of the Year
	Star Award	Dubai (2005)

PMPC Star Awards For TV

 2014   Won  Best Travel Program Host
    Star Award Pinoy Explorer (TV5, 2014) 

		
Young Critics Circle, Philippines
		
1996	Nominated	Best Performance by Male or Female, Adult or Child, Individual or Ensemble in Leading or Supporting Role
	YCC Award	Sana maulit muli (1995)

1994	Won	Best Performance by Male or Female, Adult or Child, Individual or Ensemble in Leading or Supporting Role
	YCC Award	Hindi kita malilimutan (1993)

1992	Won	Best Performance by Male or Female, Adult or Child, Individual or Ensemble in Leading or Supporting Role
	YCC Award	Joey Boy Munti, 15 anyos ka sa Muntilupa (1991)

Box-Office Entertainment Awards (Guillermo Mendoza Memorial Scholarship Foundation)

2008       Won     38th GMMSF Box-Office Entertainment Awards Film Actor of the Year

Further reading
 
 "Aga Muhlach recalls his colorful showbiz career for Inside the Cinema". Pep.ph. 2009-06-07. Retrieved 2014-06-14.

References

External links
 

1969 births
Living people
People from Santa Cruz, Manila
Male actors from Manila
Filipino male child actors
Filipino male comedians
Bicolano actors
Filipino male television actors
Aga
Bicolano people
Filipino people of German descent
Filipino people of Chinese descent
Filipino people of Spanish descent
Liberal Party (Philippines) politicians
Filipino actor-politicians
ABS-CBN personalities
TV5 (Philippine TV network) personalities
Viva Artists Agency
Filipino male film actors